Djibo Salamatou Gourouza Magagi is a government official in Niger.

In 2010, Magagi was the Minister of Urban Planning, Housing, and Regional Planning.

In 2021, Magagi was the budget minister delegate.

Currently Magagi is Minister of Industry and Youth Entrepreneurship.

References

Living people
Nigerien politicians
Year of birth missing (living people)